M. fimbriata may refer to:

Megachile fimbriata, a bee species
Mitrella fimbriata, a sea snail species

Synonyms
Melibe fimbriata, a synonym of Melibe viridis, a sea slug species